Dardan Aliu (born 23 July 1993), known professionally as Regard, is a Kosovo-Albanian disc jockey (DJ) and producer. Born and raised in Ferizaj, Aliu made his international breakthrough in 2019 with his remix of Jay Sean's single "Ride It" (2008), which resulted as a commercial success worldwide.

Life and career

Regard was born as Dardan Aliu on 23 July 1993 into an Albanian family in the city of Ferizaj, Kosovo.  Regard released a house cover of the Jay Sean song "Ride It". The cover rose to prominence after it received 4.1 million views on TikTok. DJ Regard was signed to the Ministry of Sound and "Ride It" was released in July 2019. The single topped the Spotify Viral chart in the US, and eventually had over a million plays on Spotify. By the end of August 2019, the song had been streamed over 2.4 million times in the US and entered the Billboard Hot Dance/Electronic Songs chart at number 21. The single received heavy airplay in the UK, on BBC Radio 1, the BBC Asian Network, Kiss FM and Hits Radio. It eventually reached number 1 in the Ireland singles chart, number 2 on the UK Singles Chart, and number 3 in Australia. The Head of Music Partnerships at TikTok Europe highlighted Regard's success as a "great example of how TikTok can support artists by providing a platform to promote their songs to a global audience." Regard was booked to play the BBC's Top of the Pops New Year's Eve special with Jay Sean, on 30 December 2019.

DJ Regard told Headliner Magazine that the 'Ride It' remix came to him when he was drunk: "I was very drunk returning to my apartment from my gig, and I was listening to Jay Sean's song. The rattling in my head from the sound system at my gig made the perfect combination to make the track! The moment I arrived home, I started to form the basic idea for the Ride It remix."

Regard released the follow-up single "Secrets" with British singer-songwriter Raye on 23 April 2020. The single would peak inside the top 10 of the UK Singles Chart and become certified Silver in the same country. The single would also peak inside the top 20 of numerous European countries such as the Netherlands, Belgium and Poland.

Discography

Singles

Awards and nominations

Notes

References

External links 

1993 births
Albanian musicians
Electronic dance music DJs
Kosovan musicians
Kosovan people of Albanian descent
Kosovo Albanians
Living people
Ministry of Sound artists
People from Ferizaj
Remixers